The Société Anversoise was a concession company of the Congo Free State, headquartered in Antwerp. It was, with the Lulonga Company and the Abir Congo Company, one of the main producers of rubber in the Free State.  Alongside Abir and the Lulonga Company the Société Anversoise handed back control of the concession to the Congo Free State in 1906.  The Société Anversoise merged with Abir in 1911 to form the Compagnie du Congo Belge with a focus of the management of rubber plantations instead of the harvesting of naturally occurring rubber.  The Société Anversoise was quoted on the Antwerp Stock Exchange from 27 July 1898.

See also
Adrien Goffinet

References

Bibliography

Belgian colonisation in Africa
History of the Democratic Republic of the Congo
Congo Free State
Companies based in Antwerp
1892 establishments in Belgium